Charitable prom organizations are groups, primarily in the United States, that give away prom dresses to high school girls who may not be able to otherwise afford them.  One such group, The Glass Slipper Project, works with Chicago area girls.  The project has been discussed on the website for The Oprah Winfrey Show and in the Chicago Tribune. The Perfect Prom Project is active at the University of Illinois at Urbana–Champaign.

Charitable prom organizations in the US are listed on donatemydress.org.  Some prom retail stores are also charitable prom organizations.  Synchronicity Boutique  donated over $10,700 to 240 local high schools that purchased dresses from their store in Baltimore.

References

Lists of organizations
Children's charities based in the United States
Prom